Florian Bissinger (born 30 January 1988 in Munich) is a German former cyclist, who rode professionally between 2011 and 2017 for the ,  and  teams.

Major results

2011
 1st Overall Tour of Szeklerland
1st Stage 2
 6th Raiffeisen Grand Prix
 8th Overall Tour of Greece
 8th Overall Oberösterreich Rundfahrt
 8th Ljubljana–Zagreb
 10th Scandinavian Race Uppsala
 10th Jūrmala Grand Prix
2012
 3rd Paris–Mantes-en-Yvelines
 4th Ljubljana–Zagreb
2013
 5th Overall Oberösterreich Rundfahrt
1st Stage 1
 8th Grand Prix de la ville de Nogent-sur-Oise
2014
 3rd Central European Tour Košice–Miskolc
 4th Raiffeisen Grand Prix
 6th Central European Tour Budapest GP
 10th Banja Luka–Belgrade II
2015
 3rd Raiffeisen Grand Prix
 4th Rund um Sebnitz
 5th Visegrad 4 Bicycle Race GP Czech Republic
 6th Croatia–Slovenia
 10th Overall Tour of Szeklerland
2016
 4th Overall Okolo Slovenska
 4th Overall Tour of Szeklerland
 7th Overall East Bohemia Tour
 8th Overall Tour of Bihor
1st Prologue
 10th Poreč Trophy
2017
 6th Overall Tour of Bihor
 9th Overall Okolo Slovenska

References

External links

1988 births
Living people
Cyclists from Munich
German male cyclists